Brewcaria marahuacae is a plant species in the genus Brewcaria. This species is endemic to Venezuela.

References

marahuacae
Flora of Venezuela